Matthew White Ridley, 5th Viscount Ridley,  (born 7 February 1958), is a British science writer, journalist and businessman. He is  known for his writings on science, the environment, and economics and has been a regular contributor to The Times newspaper. Ridley was chairman of the UK bank Northern Rock from 2004 to 2007, during which period it experienced the first run on a British bank in 130 years. He resigned, and the bank was bailed out by the UK government; this led to its nationalisation.  

Ridley is a libertarian, and a staunch supporter of Brexit. He inherited the viscountcy in February 2012 and was a Conservative hereditary peer from February 2013, with an elected seat in the House of Lords, until his retirement in December 2021.

Early life and education
Ridley's parents were Matthew White Ridley, 4th Viscount Ridley (1925–2012), and Lady Anne Katharine Gabrielle Lumley (1928–2006), the daughter of Roger Lumley, 11th Earl of Scarbrough. He is the nephew of the late Conservative Member of Parliament (MP) and minister Nicholas Ridley and the great grandson of Edwin Lutyens.

Ridley attended Eton College from 1970 to 1975, and then went on to Magdalen College, Oxford, to study zoology. Obtaining a BA degree with first class honours, Ridley continued with research on the mating system of the common pheasant (Phasianus colchicus) supervised by Chris Perrins for his Doctor of Philosophy degree in 1983.

Career

Journalism
Ridley joined The Economist in 1984, first working as a science editor until 1987, then as Washington, D.C. correspondent from 1987 to 1989 and as American editor from 1990 to 1992. He was a columnist for The Daily Telegraph and The Sunday Telegraph and an editor of The Best American Science Writing 2002.

From 2010 to 2013, Ridley wrote the weekly "Mind and Matter" column for The Wall Street Journal, which "explores the science of human nature and its implications".

Since 2013, Ridley has written a weekly column for The Times on science, the environment, and economics.

Ridley wrote the majority of the main article of the August 2017 edition of BBC Focus magazine. The article explains his scepticism regarding resource depletion, challenging the widespread belief that resource depletion is an important issue. He cites various previous resource scares as his evidence.

Northern Rock, 1994–2007
In 1994, Ridley became a board member of the UK bank Northern Rock. His father had been a board member for 30 years, and chairman from 1987 to 1992. Ridley became chairman in 2004.

In September 2007, Northern Rock became the first British bank since 1878 to suffer a run on its finances, at the start of the financial crisis of 2007–2010. The bank applied to the Bank of England for emergency liquidity funding at the beginning of the financial crisis of 2007–08, but failed, and Northern Rock was nationalised. He resigned as chairman in October 2007. A parliamentary committee criticised Ridley for not recognising the risks of the bank's financial strategy and "harming the reputation of the British banking industry".

Business
From 1996 to 2003, Ridley served as founding chairman of the International Centre for Life, which opened in 2000 as a non-profit science centre in Newcastle upon Tyne; and is now its honorary life president. From July 2000 to June 2008, he was a non-executive director of PA Holdings Limited, with Victor Halberstadt.

He had been a governor of the Ditchley Foundation, which organises conferences to further education and understanding of Britons and North Americans. He participated in a February 2000 Ditchley conference.

Patronage
He is a patron of Humanists UK.

Northumberlandia
The Banks Group and Blagdon estate developed and sponsored the construction of Northumberlandia, or the Lady of the North, a huge land sculpture in the shape of a reclining female figure, which was part-commissioned and sponsored by Ridley. Now run by a charity group called the Land Trust, it is the largest landform in the world depicting the human form, and, through private funding, cost £3m to build. Attracting over 100,000 people per year, the Northumberland art project, tourism and cultural landmark has won a global landscape architecture award, and has been named 'Miss World'.

The Royal Agricultural Society of England awarded the Bledisloe Gold Medal in 2015 to Ridley for the work done on his Blagdon estate, saying that it "wanted to highlight the extensive environmental improvement work that has been undertaken across the land".

Publications
Ridley is best known as the author of a number of popular science books, listed below.

The Red Queen: Sex and the Evolution of Human Nature, 1993

 In Lewis Carroll's Through the Looking-Glass, Alice meets the Red Queen who stays in the same place no matter how fast she runs. This book champions a Red Queen theory for the evolution of sexual reproduction: that it evolved so that the resultant genetic variation would thwart constantly mutating parasites.

The Origins of Virtue: Human Instincts and the Evolution of Cooperation, 1996

Genome: The Autobiography of a Species in 23 Chapters, 1999

 This book examines one newly discovered gene from each of the 23 human chromosomes. It was shortlisted for the Samuel Johnson Prize in 2000.

Nature via Nurture: Genes, Experience, & What Makes Us Human, 2003 (also later released under the title The Agile Gene: How Nature Turns on Nurture in 2004)

 This book discusses reasons why humans can be considered to be simultaneously free-willed and motivated by instinct and culture.

The Agile Gene: How Nature Turns on Nurture, 2004

Francis Crick: Discoverer of the Genetic Code, 2006

 Ridley's biography of Francis Crick won the Davis Prize for the history of science from the US History of Science Society.

The Rational Optimist: How Prosperity Evolves, 2010

 The Rational Optimist primarily focuses on the benefits of the innate human tendency to trade goods and services. Ridley argues that this trait is the source of human prosperity, and that as people increasingly specialize in their skill sets, we will have increased trade and even more prosperity. It was shortlisted for the 2011 BBC Samuel Johnson Prize.

The Evolution of Everything: How Ideas Emerge, 2015

 In The Evolution of Everything, Ridley "makes the case for evolution, rather than design, as the force that has shaped much of culture, technology and society, and that even now is shaping our future." He argues that "Change in technology, language, mortality and society is incremental, inexorable, gradual and spontaneous...Much of the human world is the result of human action, but not of human design; it emerges from the interactions of millions, not from the plans of a few." The science writer Peter Forbes, writing in The Independent, describes the book as "Ridley's magnum opus, ... decades in the making." Forbes states that Ridley was inspired by the Roman poet Lucretius's long work on "atheistical atomism", De rerum natura, whose "arguments seem uncannily modern: like those of a Richard Dawkins 2000 years avant la lettre." Forbes found the chapter on technology to be "utterly convincing", the most satisfying in the book. But he finds the "sustained polemic on behalf of libertarian anti-State ideas not a million miles from those of the US Republican Tea Party." Forbes calls Ridley "a heretic on most counts", stating that the book has many excesses. All the same, he considers the book necessary reading.

How Innovation Works: And Why It Flourishes in Freedom, 2020

 This book argues that innovation is a disorganized, bottom-up process that emerges through the aggregate work of many low-level individuals, rather than the work of solitary geniuses at the top. Moreover, innovation is poorly understood by economists, and it is often impeded by politicians. Ridley makes his case by examining historical examples, rather than appealing solely to abstract principles.

Viral: The Search for the Origin of COVID-19

Written jointly with Alina Chan, it was published in November 2021.

Although less well-known than his popular science books, Ridley's first book was Warts and All: The Men Who Would Be Bush (1989), which chronicled the evolution of George H. W. Bush's public image during the 1988 United States presidential election. In recent years, Ridley has described his first book as "bad" and has expressed gratitude that few people know about it. He no longer promotes the book on his personal website.

In 2006, Ridley contributed a chapter to Richard Dawkins: How a Scientist Changed the Way We Think, a collection of essays in honour of his friend Richard Dawkins (edited by his near-namesake Mark Ridley).

Ridley's 2010 TED conference talk, "When Ideas Have Sex", received over 2 million views. Ridley argues that exchange and specialisation are the features of human society that lead to the development of new ideas, and that human society is therefore a "collective brain".

Political and scientific views

Role of government regulation
In a 2006 edition of the online magazine Edge – the third culture, Ridley wrote a response to the question "What's your dangerous idea?" which was entitled "Government is the problem not the solution", in which he describes his attitude to government regulation: "In every age and at every time there have been people who say we need more regulation, more government. Sometimes, they say we need it to protect exchange from corruption, to set the standards and police the rules, in which case they have a point, though often they exaggerate it... The dangerous idea we all need to learn is that the more we limit the growth of government, the better off we will all be."

In 2007, the environmentalist George Monbiot wrote an article in The Guardian connecting Ridley's libertarian economic philosophy and the £27 billion failure of Northern Rock. On 1 June 2010 Monbiot followed up his previous article in the context of Matt Ridley's book The Rational Optimist, which had just been published. Monbiot took the view that Ridley had failed to learn from the collapse of Northern Rock.

Ridley has responded to Monbiot on his website, stating "George Monbiot's recent attack on me in the Guardian is misleading. I do not hate the state. In fact, my views are much more balanced than Monbiot's selective quotations imply." On 19 June 2010, Monbiot countered with another article on the Guardian website, further questioning Ridley's claims and his response. Ridley was then defended by Terence Kealey in a further article published on the Guardian website.

In November 2010, The Wall Street Journal published a lengthy exchange between Ridley and the Microsoft founder Bill Gates on topics discussed in Ridley's book The Rational Optimist. Gates said that "What Mr. Ridley fails to see is that worrying about the worst case—being pessimistic, to a degree—can actually help to drive a solution"; Ridley said "I am certainly not saying, 'Don't worry, be happy.' Rather, I'm saying, 'Don't despair, be ambitious.'"

Ridley summarised his own views on his political philosophy during the 2011 Hayek Lecture: "[T]hat the individual is not – and had not been for 120,000 years – able to support his lifestyle; that the key feature of trade is that it enables us to work for each other not just for ourselves; that there is nothing so anti-social (or impoverishing) as the pursuit of self sufficiency; and that authoritarian, top-down rule is not the source of order or progress."

In an email exchange, Ridley responded to the environmental activist Mark Lynas' repeated charges of a right-wing agenda with the following reply:

Ridley argues that the capacity of humans for change and social progress is underestimated, and denies what he sees as overly pessimistic views of global climate change and Western birthrate decline.

Climate change

In 2014, a Wall Street Journal op-ed written by Ridley was challenged by Jeffrey Sachs of Columbia University's Earth Institute. Sachs termed "absurd" Ridley's characterization of a paper in Science magazine by the two scientists Xianyao Chen and Ka-Kit Tung. Sachs challenged Ridley's contentions, and claimed that the "paper's conclusions are the very opposite of Ridley's". Ridley replied that 'it is ludicrous, nasty and false to accuse me of lying or "totally misrepresenting the science..I have asked Mr. Sachs to withdraw the charges more than once now on Twitter. He has refused to do so ...."'

Friends of the Earth has connected Ridley's opposition to climate science to his ties to the coal industry. He is the owner of land in the north-east of England on which the Shotton Surface coal mine operates, and receives payments for the mine. In 2016 he was accused of lobbying for the coal industry, based on an email he had authored to the UK government's energy minister describing a Texas-based company which planned to sequester carbon into materials useful for industrial chemical manufacturing. The complaint was summarily dismissed by the Parliamentary Commissioner for Standards.

Shale gas and fracking
Ridley was one of the earliest commentators to spot the economic significance of shale gas. He is a proponent of fracking. However, he has been found to have breached the Parliamentary Code of Conduct by the House of Lords Commissioner for Standards for not orally disclosing in debates on the subject personal interests worth at least £50,000 in Weir Group, which has been described as "the world's largest provider of special equipment used in the process" of fracking.

Euroscepticism
Ridley is a Eurosceptic and advocated the withdrawal (Brexit) of the UK from the European Union during the 2016 United Kingdom European Union membership referendum. He appeared in Brexit: The Movie, arguing for Britain to return to the policy of free trade that distinguished it after 1845 until the 1930s.

Free-market anticapitalism
Ridley wrote a 2017 column making the case for free-market anticapitalism. He makes the case that it is misleading to refer 'capitalism' and 'markets' as the same thing because "commerce, enterprise and markets are – to me – the very opposite of corporatism and even of 'capitalism', if by that word you mean capital-intensive organisations with monopolistic ambitions. Markets and innovation are the creative-destructive forces that undermine, challenge and reshape corporations and public bureaucracies on behalf of consumers. So big business is just as much the enemy as big government, and big business in hock to big government is sometimes the worst of all."

COVID-19
Ridley wrote in May 2020 that "research into the origins of the new coronavirus raises questions about how it became so infectious in human beings" and included as one possibility "perhaps laboratories". His 2021 book Viral: The Search for the Origin of COVID-19 written with Alina Chan ascribes the spread of the virus to the COVID-19 lab leak theory.

Honours, awards and titles
In 1996, he was a visiting professor at Cold Spring Harbor Laboratory in New York, and in 2006 was awarded an honorary DSc degree.

In 2003, he received an honorary DSc degree from Buckingham University and in 2007, an honorary DCL degree from Newcastle University.

In 2004, he was elected a Fellow of the Academy of Medical Sciences (FMedSci) for "major contributions to public engagement with the biological sciences".

In 2011, the Manhattan Institute awarded Ridley its $50,000 Hayek Prize for his book The Rational Optimist. In his acceptance speech, Ridley said: "As Hayek understood, it is human collaboration that is necessary for society to work... the key feature of trade is that it enables us to work for each other not just for ourselves; that attempts at self-sufficiency are the true form of selfishness as well as the quick road to poverty; and that authoritarian, top-down rule is not the source of order or progress." In 2011, Ridley gave the Angus Millar Lecture on "scientific heresy" at the Royal Society of Arts (RSA).

In 2012, on the death of his father, Ridley became the 5th Viscount Ridley and Baron Wensleydale. He is also the 9th Baronet Ridley. In 2013, he was elected as a hereditary peer to membership in the House of Lords, as a member of the Conservative Party.

In 2013, he was elected a member of the American Academy of Arts and Sciences, and won the Julian L. Simon award in March 2012. In 2014, he won the free enterprise award from the Institute of Economic Affairs.

Arms
As 5th Viscount Ridley, Matt Ridley bears arms blazoned as Gules on a Chevron Argent between three Falcons proper, as many Pellets.

Personal life
When his father died in 2012, Ridley succeeded him as the 5th Viscount Ridley, having taken over the running of the family estate of Blagdon Hall, near Stannington, Northumberland, some years before.

In 1989, Ridley married Anya Hurlbert, a Professor of Neuroscience at Newcastle University; they live in northern England and have a son and a daughter.

In 1980, his sister Rose married the British Conservative Party politician Owen Paterson, who held the posts of Secretary of State for Northern Ireland and Secretary of State for Environment, Food and Rural Affairs until July 2014. During this time Ridley was described as 'in many ways Paterson's personal think tank'.

In 2015 Ridley's team won the celebrity Christmas special of University Challenge representing Magdalen College, Oxford, the year after the team of his son, also Matthew, had won the student version representing Trinity College, Cambridge.

Notes

References

External links

 Personal webpage
 Matt Ridley's blog
 The Viscount Ridley on parliament.uk
 Treasury – Minutes of Evidence: Examination of Witnesses: Dr Matt Ridley, Chairman, Northern Rock
 Ridley interviewed for Massive Change Radio in January 2004
 Biography page on Edge.org
 
 Matt Ridley, "We've never had it so good – and it's all thanks to science," The Guardian, 3 April 2003
 Matt Ridley, "What's your dangerous idea?", The Edge On-line magazine 2006
 Matt Ridley, "Darwin's Legacy", National Geographic, February 2009.
 Matt Ridley, "Putting Darwin in Genes", Thinking Digital, May 2009.
 Matt Ridley, 'When Ideas Have Sex', a video of his TED talk
 

1958 births
Living people
21st-century atheists
21st-century journalists
Alumni of Magdalen College, Oxford
British anti-capitalists
British atheists
British bankers
British Eurosceptics
British libertarians
British male journalists
British science writers
Conservative Party (UK) hereditary peers
Deputy Lieutenants of Northumberland
The Economist people
Fellows of the American Academy of Arts and Sciences
Fellows of the Royal Society of Literature
Human evolution theorists
Lutyens family
Northern Rock
British opinion journalists
People educated at Eton College
Matthew
Science journalists
Viscounts in the Peerage of the United Kingdom
Writers from Newcastle upon Tyne
People from Stannington, Northumberland
Cornucopians
Hereditary peers elected under the House of Lords Act 1999